Fudbalski klub Sarajevo is a Bosnian professional football club based in Sarajevo, Sarajevo Canton, the capital city of Bosnia and Herzegovina and is one of the most successful clubs in the country.

This is a list of all the players that have played for the club since its foundation, in 1946.

Only players that have played at least one match in any of the following competitions: domestic league, domestic cup and European competitions.

Players that only played in friendlies, tournaments and that were on trial are not included.



A

 Rashid Abubakar
 Almin Abdihodžić 
 Samir Abdurahmanović 
 Edin Ademović
 Adi Adilović
 Joachim Adukor 
 Almir Aganspahić
 Mersudin Ahmetović
 Anton Agošton
 Muhamed Alaim
 Safet Alajbegović
 Kemal Alispahić
 Mehmed Alispahić
 Haris Ališah
 Marin Aničić
 Boško Antić
 Ensar Arifović
 Branislav Arsenijević
 Zijad Arslanagić
 Alen Avdić
 Daniel Avramovski

B

 Miloš Babić
 Dražen Bagarić 
 Milenko Bajić
 Saša Balić
 Elvir Baljić
 Srđan Bajić
 Dejan Bandović
 Tomislav Barbarić
 Mario Barić
 Bernard Barnjak
 Alen Bašić
 Boro Beatović
 Elmir Behlulović
 Elvedin Beganović
 Almir Bekić
 Amer Bekić 
 Zoran Belošević
 Leon Benko
 Džemal Berberović
 Hamza Bešić 
 Nemanja Bilbija
 Marco Bilić
 Ibrahim Biogradlić
 Miroslav Blažević
 Stjepan Blažević
 Darko Bodul 
 Branko Bošnjak
 Tomislav Bošnjak
 Boban Božović
 Dragan Božović
 Miroslav Brozović
 Sead Bučan
 Muhamed Buljubašić

C

 Džemil Cerić
 Fadil Cerić 
 Tarik Cerić
 Gojko Cimirot
 Boris Cmiljanić 
 Ljuban Crepulja
 Nermin Crnkić
 Stojan Crnogorac

Ć

 Marko Ćetković
 Miodrag Ćirković

Č
 Hamza Čataković
 Frane Čirjak
 Adin Čiva 
 Denis Čomor
 Muhidin Čoralić

D

 Muamer Dalipagić
 Fahrija Dautbegović
 Mirsad Dedić
 Matej Delač
 Salih Delalić
 Kenan Dervišagić 
 Secouba Diatta 
 Sreten Dilberović
 Belmin Dizdarević
 Patrik Doçi
 Vojislav Dragović
 Vlatko Drobarov
 Feđa Dudić
 Esad Dugalić
 Haris Duljević
 Amer Dupovac
 Zlatko Dupovac
 Samir Duro

Đ

 Andrej Đokanović 
 Miloš Đurković

Dž

 Elvis Džafić 
 Adin Džafić
 Muhamed Džakmić

E

 Savo Ekmečić

F

 Matthias Fanimo 
 Mirsad Fazlagić
 Said Fazlagić
 Irfan Fejzić
 Sedik Fejzić 
 Amar Ferhatović
 Asim Ferhatović
 Hamid Ferhatović 
 Nidal Ferhatović 
 Nijaz Ferhatović

G
 Nebojša Gavrić
 Nudžein Geca
 Midhat Gluhačević
 Nermin Gogalić
 Emir Granov
 Vladan Grujić
 Boris Gujić
 Giorgi Guliashvili
 Hilmo Gutić
 Adnan Gušo
 Aleksandar Guzina
 Gedeon Guzina

H

 Edin Hadžialagić
 Faruk Hadžibegić
 Damir Hadžić 
 Emir Hadžić
 Dado Hamzagić 
 Dino Hamzić
 Faris Handžić
 Haris Handžić
 Irfan Handžić
 Kenan Handžić
 Admir Hasančić
 Nermin Haskić
 Anes Haurdić
 Anel Hebibović
 César Augusto Hermenegildo
 Reuf Herco
 Nedim Hiroš
 Drago Hmelina
 Aaron Horton
 Dušan Hodžić
 Faruk Hodžić 
 Ibro Hodžić 
 Sead Hodžić
 Dženan Hošić
 Almedin Hota
 Adnan Hrelja
 Almir Hurtić
 Ermin Huseinbašić
 Said Husejinović
 Edin Husić

I

 Ferid Idrizović
 Faruk Ihtijarević
 Harmony Ikande
 Armin Imamović 
 Dino Islamović
 Perica Ivetić

J

 Haris Jaganjac
 Adis Jahović
 Mato Jajalo
 Davor Jakovljević
 Dragan Jakovljević
 Anto Jakovljević
 Emir Janjoš
 Mehmed Janjoš
 Slobodan Janjuš
 Amar Jašarević
 Sead Jesenković
 Dušan Jevtić
 Bojan Jović
 Davor Jozić
 Ivica Jozić
 Dušan Jovanović
 Juninho Botelho
 Goran Jurišić
 Nedim Jusufbegović
 Osman Jusufbegović

K

 Ahmad Kalasi
 Adnan Kanurić 
 Adis Kapetanović 
 Mirza Kapetanović
 Sead Kapetanović
 Vladimir Karalić
 Žarko Karamatić
 Haris Karamehmedović
 Elvis Karić
 Rijad Kobiljar 
 Damir Kojašević
 Nikola Komazec
 Muhamed Konjić 
 Predrag Koprivica
 Miroljub Kostić
 Germain Kouadio
 Adnan Kovačević
 Goran Kovačević
 Vladan Kovačević 
 Denis Kramar
 Sulejman Krpić
 Simo Krunić
 Mirzet Kruprinac
 Dane Kuprešanin
 Numan Kurdić

L
 Darko Lazić
 Igor Lazić
 Frank Liivak 
 Zoran Ljubičić
 Đuka Lovrić
 Franjo Lovrić
 Enver Lugušić
 Emerson Reis Luiz
 Zoran Lukić

M

 Marinko Mačkić
 Smajo Mahmutović
 Osman Maglajlija
 Anton Mandić
 Milan Makić
 Marko Maksimović
 Ajdin Maksumić
 Lev Mantula
 Marciano José do Nascimento
 Srboljub Markušević
 Ilija Martinović
 Matija Matko
 Ivan Matošević
 Alen Melunović
 Nijaz Merdanović
 Senad Merdanović
 Enes Mešanović
 Jasmin Mešanović  
 Mirza Mešić
 Marko Mihojević 
 Nihad Milak
 Slobodan Milanović 
 Ninoslav Milenković
 Hrvoje Miličević 
 Semjon Milošević
 Damir Mirvić
 Risto Mitrevski
 Gregor Mohar
 Refik Muftić
 Musa Muhammed
 Haris Muharemović
 Veldin Muharemović
 Nihad Mujakić 
 Ismet Mulavdić
 Husref Musemić
 Vahidin Musemić
 Alen Mustafić 
 Zinedin Mustedanagić
 Džemaludin Mušović
 Fuad Muzurović

N

 Nathan
 Safet Nadarević
 Miloš Nedić
 Vladimir Nikitović
 Mile Novaković 
 Saša Novaković
 Nerčez Novo
 Jean-Louis Nouken
 Samir Nuhanović

O

 Emir Obuća
 Godfrey Ogbonna 
 Branko Okić
 Ševko Okić
 Renan Oliveira
 Mirko Oremuš 
 Abdulah Oruč
 Amer Osmanagić
 Adnan Osmanhodžić
 Senedin Oštraković

P

 Kerim Palić 
 Dalibor Pandža
 Đorđe Pantić
 Predrag Pašić
 Bojan Pavlović
 Ivica Pavlović
 Edin Pehlić
 Aleksandar Pejović 
 Albin Pelak
 Ranko Petković
 Vladimir Petković
 Vukašin Petranović
 Selmir Pidro 
 Ismir Pintol
 Denijal Pirić
 Emir Plakalo
 Almir Pliska
 Edin Prljača
 Fahrudin Prljača
Boško Prodanović
 Radoš Protić
 Aleksei Prudnikov
 Antal Puhalak
 Dario Purić
 Bojan Puzigaća

R

 Darko Raca
 Ferid Radeljaš
 Manojlo Radinović
 Samir Radovac 
 Amar Rahmanović 
 Dejan Raičković
 Ante Rajković
 Milan Rajlić
 Irfan Ramić
 Admir Raščić
 Sulejman Rebac
 Rasim Reiz
 Srebrenko Repčić
 Senad Repuh
 Ševkija Resić 
 Aleksandar Ristić
 Mirza Rizvanović 
 Edin Rustemović

S

 Amar Sabljica 
 Rijad Sadiku 
 Mirnel Sadović 
 Đani Salčin 
 Fuad Salihović
 Elvis Sarić 
 Marko Savić
 Radomir Savić
 Ivan Sesar
 Dragoljub Simić
 Edin Smajić
 Haris Smajić
 Dragan Simić
 Ibrahim Sirćo
 Džemo Smječanin
 Admir Softić
 Duško Stajić
 Milan Stepanov
 Mladen Stipić
 Miloš Stojčev
 Memnun Suljagić
 Asmir Suljić
 Safet Sušić
 Sead Sušić
 Tino-Sven Sušić

Š

 Muhamed Šahinović 
 Zdravko Šaraba
 Murat Šaran
 Edin Šaranović
 Samir Šarić
 Fuad Šašivarević
 Vučina Šćepanović
 Nail Šehović
 Salih Šehović
 Besim Šerbečić 
 Vicko Ševelj 
 Sreten Šiljkut
 Aladin Šišić
 Alen Škoro
 Anel Škoro 
 Edhem Šljivo
 Aleksandar Šofranac 
 Radan Šunjevarić
 Suad Švraka
 Zijad Švrakić

T

 Mario Tadejević
 Dragan Talajić 
  Benjamin Tatar 
 Ivan Tatomirović
 Anđelko Tešan
 Muhidin Teskeredžić
 Ognjen Todorović
 Almir Tolja
 Sedin Torlak
 Muharem Trako
 Anid Travančić
 Vule Trivunović
 Emir Tufek
 Almir Turković
 Nedim Tutić

U

 Fahrudin Ulak
 Dženan Uščuplić
 Ervin Uščuplić

V

 Azrudin Valentić 
 Dal Varešanović 
 Mirza Varešanović
 Vejsil Varupa
 Nermin Vazda
 Jasminko Velić
 Krste Velkoski
 Nenad Vidaković
 Risto Vidaković
 Želimir Vidović
 Vukašin Višnjevac
 Anton Vlajčić
 Damir Vrabac
 Dinko Vrabac
 Dragoslav Vujanović
 Svetozar Vujović
 Dragoslav Vukadin
 Slaviša Vukićević
 Sretko Vuksanović
 Irfan Vušljanin

Z

 Nenad Zečević
 Vlado Zadro
 Ševal Zahirović
 Zoran Zekić 
 Sead Zilić
 Almedin Ziljkić
 Nemanja Zlatković
 Dilaver Zrnanović
 Muhidin Zukić

Ž

 Marcel Žigante
 Drago Žigman
 Dobrivoje Živkov
 Boris Živković

(not completed yet)

External links
Official Website 
FK Sarajevo at Facebook
FK Sarajevo at Twitter
FK Sarajevo at UEFA
FKSinfo 

 
Sarajevo
Association football player non-biographical articles